Hungry Run is a  long tributary to South Branch French Creek in Erie County, Pennsylvania and is classed as a 2nd order stream on the EPA waters geoviewer site.

Course
Hungry Run rises in Bloomfield Township of northern Crawford County and then flows north into Erie County through Union Township where it meets South Branch French Creek.

Watershed
Hungry Run drains  of Erie Drift Plain (glacial geology).  The watershed receives an average of 46.6 in/year of precipitation and has a wetness index of 469.09.

Additional Images

References

Rivers of Pennsylvania
Rivers of Erie County, Pennsylvania
Rivers of Crawford County, Pennsylvania